The Furnace is a quarterly literary magazine edited by Kelli Kavanaugh and a board of editors.

History and profile
The Furnace was launched September 28, 2002. Editorial offices are located at the Bohemian National Home, Tillman Avenue, in Detroit's Corktown district. It is published on a quarterly basis. The magazine covers Detroit culture, including visual arts, architecture, urban development, literature, history and music.

The Furnace has published a number of notable Detroit authors and manifestos from collectives:
 Zuriel Wolfgang Lott
 Mariela Griffor
 Architects Asylum
 Lisa Runchey
 Vievee Francis
 Joanna Karner
 Eric Darby
 Robert Fanning
 Terry Blackhawk
 Gary C. Wagaman

As a practice, the editorial team marks release of a new edition by organizing an event, often at a lost Detroit venue. For example, the editors held the first issue celebration at the Savoyard Club, in the Buhl Building at Griswold, Detroit, Michigan. Several of The Furnace's writers and a poetry editor have been a crucial part of Write Word Write Now, (a cohort of Detroit's up and coming page poets).

References

External links
 The Furnace - Detroit Literary Magazine

2002 establishments in Michigan
Literary magazines published in the United States
Local interest magazines published in the United States
Magazines established in 2002
Magazines published in Detroit
Quarterly magazines published in the United States